William Charles Bowser (June 25, 1915 – June 28, 2006) served as a member of the all-black Pea Island Life-Saving Station along the Outer Banks of North Carolina from 1935 to 1938. He was one of the last surviving members of the Pea Island Station that was decommissioned after World War II. Bowser received the U.S. Coast Guard Gold Lifesaving Medal in March 1996 at the Navy Memorial in Washington, D.C. on behalf of the crew of the historic 1896 rescue of nine persons from the schooner E.S. Newman. Authors David Wright and David Zoby co-wrote the history of the Pea Island Station in the book titled "Fire on the Beach".
After retiring from the coast guard service, he started a barber service, then returned to study. He achieved his doctorate in sociology and moved to Florida, where he advised the local board of education.

External links
Pea Island LSS Crew's Gold Lifesaving Medal Rescue
Television news-story on Pea Island surfmen, featuring William Bowser
U.S. Coast Guard Station Pea Island

1915 births
2006 deaths
United States Coast Guard officers
Recipients of the Gold Lifesaving Medal